Bernd Duvigneau (born 3 December 1955 in Magdeburg) is an East German sprint canoeist who competed in the late 1970s and early 1980s. Competing in two Summer Olympics, he won two medals in the K-4 1000 m event with a gold in 1980 and a bronze in 1976.

Duvigneau also won five gold medals at the ICF Canoe Sprint World Championships, earning them in the K-4 500 m (1978, 1979) and the K-4 1000 m (1974, 1978, 1979) events.

References

External links
 
 

1955 births
Sportspeople from Magdeburg
Canoeists at the 1976 Summer Olympics
Canoeists at the 1980 Summer Olympics
German male canoeists
Living people
Olympic canoeists of East Germany
Olympic gold medalists for East Germany
Olympic bronze medalists for East Germany
Olympic medalists in canoeing
ICF Canoe Sprint World Championships medalists in kayak
Medalists at the 1980 Summer Olympics
Medalists at the 1976 Summer Olympics